Page Park is a census-designated place (CDP) in Lee County, Florida, United States. The population was 747 at the 2020 census. It is part of the  Cape Coral-Fort Myers, Florida Metropolitan Statistical Area.

Geography
It is bordered to the north by Page Field, a public airport, and to the south by unincorporated Fort Myers Villas.

Demographics

As of the census of 2000, there were 524 people, 235 households, and 105 families residing in the CDP. The racial makeup of the CDP was 86.45% White, 3.05% African American, 0.19% Asian, 0.19% Pacific Islander, 8.21% from other races, and 1.91% from two or more races. Hispanic or Latino of any race were 21.76% of the population.

There were 235 households, out of which 26.0% had children under the age of 18 living with them, 23.4% were married couples living together, 13.6% had a female householder with no husband present, and 55.3% were non-families. 40.4% of all households were made up of individuals, and 3.4% had someone living alone who was 65 years of age or older.  The average household size was 2.23 and the average family size was 3.07.

In the CDP, the population was spread out, with 21.2% under the age of 18, 12.6% from 18 to 24, 39.5% from 25 to 44, 20.6% from 45 to 64, and 6.1% who were 65 years of age or older.  The median age was 32 years. For every 100 females, there were 149.5 males.  For every 100 females age 18 and over, there were 147.3 males.

The median income for a household in the CDP was $23,600, and the median income for a family was $30,391. Males had a median income of $23,676 versus $21,042 for females. The per capita income for the CDP was $14,281.  About 13.4% of families and 13.2% of the population were below the poverty line, including 19.8% of those under age 18 and 11.9% of those age 65 or over.

References

Census-designated places in Lee County, Florida
Census-designated places in Florida